"Crawling in the Dark" is the first single by American rock band Hoobastank, released from their major-label debut, Hoobastank.

The song was released as a single on October 2, 2001. A nu metal song, the single was their breakthrough hit and is their second most successful song from their debut album behind their second hit "Running Away". It reached No. 3 on the Modern Rock Tracks chart and No. 7 on the Mainstream Rock Tracks chart.

Track listing

Charts

Release history

References

Hoobastank songs
2001 debut singles
2001 songs
Island Records singles
Mercury Records singles
Music videos directed by Marcos Siega
Songs written by Dan Estrin
Songs written by Doug Robb
Songs written by Chris Hesse